Bayles may refer to:

 Bayles, Cumbria, a hamlet in England
 Bayles, Victoria, a locality in Australia
 Bayles (name), a surname